Ni Yulan (born 24 March 1960) is a civil rights lawyer in the People's Republic of China. She has established herself in defending human rights in China by providing legal aid to persecuted groups such as Falun Gong practitioners and victims of forced eviction.

Ni has gone through multiple arrests, three prison sentences, and torture following her human rights cases against the Chinese government. Her license to practice law was later revoked by Chinese authorities.

In 2011, the Dutch government awarded Ni the Human Rights Tulip, and in 2016, the United States Department of State gave her the International Women of Courage Award.

Education and career

Ni entered Beijing Language and Culture University in 1978 and obtained a bachelor's degree in Chinese. She went on to obtain a law degree from China University of Political Science and Law, and became a lawyer in 1986. She then worked as a legal consultant at China International Trading Corporation while being simultaneously employed as an attorney at Justice Law Firm.

Ni is said to have been monitored by the Chinese government since 1999, when she provided legal assistance to a Falun Gong practitioner. In 2001, when Ni's neighborhood in Beijing had been slated for mandatory demolition in order to accommodate the upcoming 2008 Beijing Olympics, she helped her neighbors by either attempting to save their homes from being demolished or by demanding equitable compensation.

Arrests and imprisonment

First arrest and imprisonment

In April 2002, Ni was arrested by the police while filming the forced destruction of a neighbor's home. She was then detained for 75 days.
Ni said that during her detention, she was kicked and beaten continuously for 15 hours, consequently leaving her maimed and since then in need of crutches to walk.

Ni was again arrested in September that year while petitioning the Beijing National People's Congress Standing Committee about her having been beaten in police custody. Nonetheless, instead of receiving recompense, she was sentenced to a year in prison for "obstructing official business". Additionally, her lawyer's license was revoked.

In November 2005, before then US president George W. Bush's visit to China, Chinese police warned Ni against leaving her home. Two days later, when she was taking a walk in a park near her home, she was assaulted by unidentified men. However, when she reported the attack to the police, she herself was taken into custody.

Second arrest and imprisonment

In August 2008, Ni was arrested when her own home was forcibly demolished, and was sentenced to two years in prison for “obstructing official business”, the same crime as her first conviction. Her family members were not allowed to visit her during that period. After being released, Ni said that she had been beaten harshly to the point that she could only crawl on the prison floor during her imprisonment. Additionally, according to Ni, she was denied access to the toilet along with having a limited water supply because authorities said that it was punishment for her denial of guilt.

Ni was without a home upon her release. Nevertheless, the police still made it difficult for her when she attempted to rent a hotel room or an apartment. As a result, she and her husband camped in a tent at a park in central Beijing. After drawing significant news media attention, authorities then moved the couple to a hotel room.

Third arrest and imprisonment

On 7 April 2011, Ni and her husband were detained by police as part of a nationwide crackdown on dissent. Ni described multiple instances of abuse during her detention, including once when an officer urinated on her face, and another taking her crutches away and forcing her to crawl from her cell to the prison workshop.

In Beijing on 29 December 2011, Chinese authorities put Ni Yulan on trial for alleged fraud. Owing to mistreatment during Ni's detention, she was in poor health upon her appearance in court and was propped up on a makeshift bed with an oxygen mask tied to her face. Ni's trial drew many spectators outside the courthouse, as they were denied entry and were surrounded by more than a hundred police officers. According to Radio Free Asia, aside from spectators facing obstacles, a number of Ni's witnesses were also confined to their homes by Chinese police prior to Ni's trial, making them unable to testify for Ni.

In April 2012, Ni was sentenced to two years and eight months in prison for “causing a disturbance” and "fraud". Her husband, Dong Jiqin, was similarly sentenced to two years for "causing a disturbance". However, rights activists argue that the charges were fabricated in order to stifle dissent. Ni completed her third sentence on 5 October 2013. According to Ni, her illness had not been treated during her detention, and she was, as a result, in poor health upon release.

Continued harassment

Following Ni Yulan's release in 2013, she and her family have continued to face a series of human rights violations, which include being defrauded, monitored, followed, forcibly evicted from their homes without prior warning, and having her passport arbitrarily denied by Chinese government authorities.

In 2016, Ni was prevented by Chinese authorities from leaving China to attend The US Award Ceremony, where she would have received the International Women of Courage Award. Chinese authorities have repeatedly refused to issue her a passport. Ni speculated that it was because authorities had gotten infuriated by her efforts at drawing social media attention to the cause of detained human rights lawyers in 2015.

Soon after the Chinese government's denial of Ni's passport application, on 2 April 2016, a group of around twenty people forcibly removed her from her home in Beijing and assaulted her husband. Subsequently, the company managing the property told Ni that it had faced pressure from the government's security forces to evict her.

Another incident of harassment occurred in April 2017. At the beginning of April, after Ni Yulan had signed a contract and paid 40,000 yuan for renting an apartment over several months, the landlord informed her that the apartment was in a restricted housing unit, and that she had to leave by 15 April 2017. In addition, the landlord stated that only 8,000 yuan of her payment could be refunded. The landlord also told her that it was the local police department who had instructed the eviction and refusal to refund fully.

On 14 April 2017, the windows of Ni's apartment were smashed and the electricity was cut off. During the night of 15 April, a group of men broke into Ni's apartment, seized the family's cell phones, and dragged the family members into two vans waiting outside the building. The two vans then drove around the city for hours, during which time Ni was injured on the back and ankle, while her husband was injured on the head and leg. The family were then left at an unfamiliar location away from their apartment. Their belongings were also removed from their apartment and left in the street.

Awards 

In 2011, Ni received the Human Rights Tulip, an annual award presented by the government of the Netherlands. Initially, Ni's daughter had asked for the ceremony to be delayed for two weeks since Ni was facing trial at the time, and it was feared that Ni receiving the award might aggravate her situation in China. However, the ceremony had to be cancelled later since Ni's daughter, who would have represented her mother at the ceremony, was not allowed to leave China.

In 2016, she received the International Women of Courage Award. During the ceremony, which Ni was barred by Chinese authorities from attending, then U.S. secretary of State John Kerry said: Ni Yulan has paid a steep price for her efforts to assert the legal rights of Chinese citizens. Her outspokenness has led her to imprisonment, during which she was beaten so badly that she became paralyzed from the waist down, but that hasn't stopped her [...] She continues to defend the property rights of Beijing residents whose homes have been slated for demolition.

References

External links
Urgent action CASE FILE for Ni Yulan (倪玉兰) by CHINESE URGENT ACTION WORKING GROUP
"China Set to Punish Another Human Rights Activist article by Andrew Jacobs in The New York Times 2 January 2012
"Ni Yulan Appeals Conviction; U.S. and EU Call for Her Release" case update by Human Rights in China, 17 April 2012
Ni Yulan Youtube playlist

Chinese dissidents
Chinese democracy activists
Chinese human rights activists
Prisoners and detainees of the People's Republic of China
20th-century Chinese lawyers
21st-century Chinese lawyers
Weiquan movement
Living people
1960 births
Women human rights activists
Recipients of the International Women of Courage Award
20th-century Chinese women
21st-century Chinese women